Zadlaz–Čadrg is a settlement in the hills northeast of Tolmin in the Littoral region of Slovenia. It is accessible by road through the village of Zatolmin.

References

External links
Zadlaz–Čadrg on Geopedia

Populated places in the Municipality of Tolmin